Kaizer Lau Ping-cheung, GBS (born 3 October 1951, Chiu Chow, Guangdong, China) is a surveyor and was the member of the Legislative Council of Hong Kong in 2000–04 for the Architectural, Surveying and Planning constituency and non executive director of the Urban Renewal Authority. He is the fellow of the Royal Institution of Chartered Surveyors and Hong Kong Institute of Surveyors.

Lau is also a non-official member of the Lantau Development Advisory Committee (LanDAC), which has controversially proposed developing Lantau Island to house up to one million residents (up from the current population of around 100,000). Lau stated that the proposed developments were "relatively small scale and would not pose much conflict with conservation", though the area marked for "conservation" actually includes large-scale commercial development such as the construction of resort hotels at Cheung Sha.

Lau also served as the deputy director of the election campaign of Leung Chun-ying in the run-up to the 2012 Chief Executive election. Leung won a five-year term, beginning on 1 July 2012, with 689 votes. Speaking on the upcoming 2017 election, Lau stated that CY Leung would run again, and that the grievances of young people during his administration were not "genuine" and that they had "overly high expectations". He also stated that Leung could have achieved more were it not for filibustering by pan-democratic legislators.

References

External links
 Members' Biographies, Legislative Council of Hong Kong

1951 births
Living people
HK LegCo Members 2000–2004
Alumni of the University of Hong Kong
Hong Kong surveyors
Recipients of the Silver Bauhinia Star
Recipients of the Gold Bauhinia Star
Members of the 13th Chinese People's Political Consultative Conference
Members of the National Committee of the Chinese People's Political Consultative Conference